The AN/MSR-T4 Threat Reaction Analysis Indicator System (TRAINS) is a radar receiver/data processing system developed for post-Cold War evaluation of military attack aircraft crews during training missions.  TRAINS evaluated the Electronic Warfare Officer or other crewmember's Electronic Countermeasures (ECM) against air defense radar by analyzing "the accuracy and effectiveness of inflight ECM performance for combat aircraft ECM pods and internal ECM suite".  The system captured, recorded, and analyzed transmissions  (e.g., jamming against a ground radar) from aircraft responding to threats simulated by  the US Dynamics AN/MST-T1 Multiple Threat Emitter Simulator (MUTES) to which the TRAINS was slaved for pointing toward the aircraft.  TRAINS data identified the EWO's actions, response times, etc.; and the system included a VHF/UHF receiver and training set.

TRAINS was developed under Electronic Systems Division program 806L after the 1991 Gulf War which identified electronic warfare "shortfalls" and was funded for overhaul in 1999 (Defense Systems Inc.added narrowband receivers to the system in 2006.)  In 1976, an MS was proposed as an "emitter" in the General Dynamics range design (Range Instrumentation System) for the electronic threat environment at the Hill/Westover/Dugway Ranges ("AFLC Test Range Complex"), and a TRAINS was at the Smoky Hill Air National Guard Range .

References

Cold War military computer systems of the United States

Radars of the United States Air Force

Equipment of the United States Air Force